Valeri Ivanovich Kravchenko (2 February 1939 – 3 September 1996) is a Soviet former volleyball player who competed for the Soviet Union in the 1968 Summer Olympics and in the 1972 Summer Olympics. He was born in the Kabodiyen, Khatlon, Tajik SSR. He played for Burevestnik Alma-Ata. In 1968, he was part of the Soviet team which won the gold medal in the Olympic tournament. He played eight matches. Four years later he won the bronze medal with the Soviet team in the 1972 Olympic tournament. He played six matches.

External links

Biography of Valeri Kravchenko 

1939 births
1996 deaths
People from Khatlon Region
Soviet men's volleyball players
Olympic volleyball players of the Soviet Union
Volleyball players at the 1968 Summer Olympics
Volleyball players at the 1972 Summer Olympics
Olympic gold medalists for the Soviet Union
Olympic bronze medalists for the Soviet Union
Olympic medalists in volleyball
Tajikistani people of Ukrainian descent
Kazakhstani people of Ukrainian descent
Kazakhstani men's volleyball players
Medalists at the 1972 Summer Olympics
Medalists at the 1968 Summer Olympics
Honoured Masters of Sport of the USSR
Burevestnik (sports society) athletes